Yayladere District is a district of Bingöl Province in Turkey. The town of Yayladere is the seat and the district had a population of 2,052 in 2021.

The district was established in 1987.

Composition 
Beside the town of Yayladere, the district encompasses twenty villages and seventy-three hamlets.

 Alınyazı
 Aydınlar 
 Batıayaz
 Bilekkaya
 Boğazköy
 Çalıkağıl
 Çatalkaya
 Çayağzı
 Çikan
 Dalbasan
 Gökçedal
 Güneşlik
 Günlük
 Kalkanlı
 Kırköy
 Korlu
 Sürmelikoç
 Yavuztaş
 Yaylabağ
 Zeynelli

References 

Districts of Bingöl Province
Yayladere District